Eubanks may refer to:

Eubanks (surname)
Eubank, Kentucky, also known as Eubanks
Eubanks, Oklahoma, ghost town
Eubanks, Virginia 
Eubanks, North Carolina
Mount Eubanks, mountain in Antarctica
Eubanks Point, headland in Antarctica
6696 Eubanks, an asteroid

See also
Eubank, a surname